Tuberorachidion is a genus of beetles in the family Cerambycidae, containing the following species:

 Tuberorachidion lanei Tippmann, 1953
 Tuberorachidion pumilio (Gounelle, 1911)

References

Trachyderini
Cerambycidae genera